Hady Camara (born 17 January 2002) is a French professional footballer who plays as a defender for Ligue 2 club Guingamp.

Career
Camara is a youth product of Paris 13 Atletico, and moved to Guingamp's youth academy in 2018. He began his career with their reserves in 2020. On 11 June 2020, he signed his first professional contract with Guingamp for 2 years.

International career
Born in France, Camara is of Senegalese descent. He was called up to the France U20s in September 2021, making 2 appearances.

References

External links 
 
 
 FFF Profile

2002 births
Living people
Footballers from Paris
French footballers
France youth international footballers
Association football defenders
Association football central defenders
En Avant Guingamp players
Championnat National 2 players
Ligue 2 players
French sportspeople of Senegalese descent
Black French sportspeople